The zero-energy universe hypothesis proposes that the total amount of energy in the universe is exactly zero: its amount of positive energy in the form of matter is exactly canceled out by its negative energy in the form of gravity. Some physicists, such as Lawrence Krauss, Stephen Hawking or Alexander Vilenkin, call or called this state "a universe from nothingness", although the zero-energy universe model requires both a matter field with positive energy and a gravitational field with negative energy to exist. The hypothesis is broadly discussed in popular sources. Other cancellation examples include the expected symmetric prevalence of right- and left-handed angular momenta of objects ("spin" in the common sense), the observed flatness of the universe, the equal prevalence of positive and negative charges, opposing particle spin in quantum mechanics, as well as the crests and troughs of electromagnetic waves, among other possible examples in nature.

History
During World War II, Pascual Jordan first suggested that since the positive energy of a star's mass and the negative energy of its gravitational field together may have zero total energy, conservation of energy would not prevent a star being created by a quantum transition of the vacuum. George Gamow recounted putting this idea to Albert Einstein: "Einstein stopped in his tracks and, since we were crossing a street, several cars had to stop to avoid running us down". Elaboration of the concept was slow, with the first notable calculation being performed by Richard Feynman in 1962. The first known publication on the topic was in 1973, when Edward Tryon proposed in the journal Nature that the universe emerged from a large-scale quantum fluctuation of vacuum energy, resulting in its positive mass-energy being exactly balanced by its negative gravitational potential energy. In the subsequent decades, development of the concept was constantly plagued by the dependence of the calculated masses on the selection of the coordinate systems. In particular, a problem arises due to energy associated with coordinate systems co-rotating with the entire universe. A first constraint was derived in 1987 when Alan Guth published a proof of gravitational energy being negative to matter associated mass-energy. The question of the mechanism permitting generation of both positive and negative energy from null initial solution was not understood, and an ad hoc solution with cyclic time was proposed by Stephen Hawking in 1988. 

In 1994, development of the theory resumed following the publication of a work by Nathan Rosen, in which Rosen described a special case of closed universe. In 1995, J.V. Johri demonstrated that the total energy of Rosen's universe is zero in any universe compliant with a Friedmann–Lemaître–Robertson–Walker metric, and proposed a mechanism of inflation-driven generation of matter in a young universe. The zero energy solution for Minkowski space representing an observable universe, was provided in 2009.

Experimental constraints
Experimental proof for the observable universe being a "zero-energy universe" is currently inconclusive. Gravitational energy from visible matter accounts for 26–37% of the observed total mass–energy density. Therefore to fit the concept of a "zero-energy universe" to the observed universe, other negative energy reservoirs besides gravity from baryonic matter are necessary. These reservoirs are frequently assumed to be dark matter.

See also 
 A Universe from Nothing
 False vacuum

References

Physical cosmology
0 (number)
Energy (physics)
Conservation equations